Mali Kal is a small settlement in the hills north of Šentvid pri Stični in the Municipality of Ivančna Gorica in central Slovenia. The area is part of the historical region of Lower Carniola. The municipality is now included in the Central Slovenia Statistical Region.

Name
The name of the settlement was changed from Farški Kal (literally, 'parish pond') to Mali Kal (literally, 'little pond') in 1953. The name was changed on the basis of the 1948 Law on Names of Settlements and Designations of Squares, Streets, and Buildings as part of efforts by Slovenia's postwar communist government to remove religious elements from toponyms. Prior to this, Mali Kal was the name of a hamlet of Farški Kal.

References

External links
Mali Kal on Geopedia

Populated places in the Municipality of Ivančna Gorica